The Aero Spacelines Pregnant Guppy was a large, wide-bodied cargo aircraft built in the United States and used for ferrying outsized cargo items, most notably components of NASA's Apollo program. The Pregnant Guppy was the first of the Guppy line of aircraft produced by Aero Spacelines. The design inspired later designs, such as the jet-powered Airbus Beluga and Boeing Dreamlifter.

Development

In 1960, NASA was using barges to transport increasingly large rocket components from manufacturers on the West Coast to test and launch sites on the East Coast, a method that was slow and expensive. Meanwhile, U.S. airlines were disposing of their obsolete piston-engined Boeing 377 Stratocruisers in favor of the newer jet-engined airliners. Aircraft broker Leo Mansdorf was stockpiling surplus Stratocruisers at Van Nuys for resale. 

Ex-USAF pilot John M. Conroy realized that these aircraft could be modified to transport the large but relatively light rocket components. Conroy presented his plans for an extensively modified Stratocruiser to NASA, where an official commented that the bloated aircraft resembled a pregnant guppy. Although NASA was lukewarm on the concept, Conroy mortgaged his house and founded Aero Spacelines International  to build and operate the concept aircraft.

Conversion work was undertaken by On Mark Engineering. The Pregnant Guppy (registered N1024V) used an ex-Pan Am airframe. A 5-meter section from an ex-British Overseas Airways Corporation aircraft (G-AKGJ) was added immediately behind the wing. A new upper fuselage of 6-meter diameter was added, giving the aircraft a "triple-bubble" appearance when viewed from the front. The entire rear section, including tail surfaces, was detachable to allow cargo to be loaded directly into the fuselage. The wing, engines, tail, nose, and cockpit were unchanged.

The aircraft first flew on September 19, 1962, piloted by Conroy and co-pilot Clay Lacy. When Van Nuys traffic control realized that Conroy intended to take off, they notified police and fire departments to be on alert. However, the huge aircraft performed flawlessly. It differed in handling from a Stratocruiser only in a slight decrease in speed caused by the drag of the larger fuselage.

The Guppy delivered the S-IV Saturn I rocket stage three weeks faster than a barge, for a cost of $16.00 (equivalent to $ today) per mile.

Operational history

In the summer of 1963, the Pregnant Guppy began flying NASA cargo. Among its early duties was transporting the first and second stages of the Gemini program's Titan II from the Martin Co. in Baltimore, Maryland, to Cape Canaveral. As the space program grew through the late 1960s, it became apparent that the one original aircraft clearly could not handle the whole transport load, so 25 more Stratocruisers and ex-USAF C-97s were purchased to construct four Super Guppy aircraft, which were even longer and larger than the original.

The various Guppy aircraft served throughout the 1960s, 1970s, and beyond. After the Apollo program ended, the aircraft transported airliner sections.

The Pregnant Guppy was sold to American Jet Industries and registered N126AJ for scrap. It was scrapped at Van Nuys in 1979.

Specifications (B337PG Pregnant Guppy)

See also

References

Works cited

External links

 "Model 377 Stratocruiser Commercial Transport" by Boeing. Retrieved October 5, 2006.
 "All About Guppys", by Daren Savage. Updated September 17, 2006. Retrieved October 5, 2006.
 It's a Plane: One man's obsession, it helped get us to the moon Tripp, Robert S. Spring 2002, American Heritage of Invention and Technology
 "Boeing 377 Pregnant Guppy" by Kenneth W. Shanaberger. Updated August 31, 2004. Retrieved October 5, 2006.
 "The Plane That Won The Space Race" by Margy Bloom. Retrieved May/June 2010.
 "The Pregnant Guppy" Historic Wings: Daily Stories. Retrieved September 19, 2012

Pregnant Guppy
On Mark aircraft
1960s United States cargo aircraft
Four-engined tractor aircraft
Low-wing aircraft
Aircraft first flown in 1962
Four-engined piston aircraft
Aircraft related to spaceflight